James Gabriel (10 October 1940 – 10 July 2021) was a Scottish football defensive midfielder and defender who earned two caps with the Scotland national football team. Chiefly associated with English clubs Everton and Southampton, Gabriel played extensively in Scotland and England before ending his career with the Seattle Sounders of the North American Soccer League. He then became a coach in both England and the United States.

Playing career

Dundee
Jimmy Gabriel first came to the attention of Dundee when he played at right-half for the Scotland under-15 schoolboys in an international at Dens Park. His talent shone through and Dundee manager Willie Thornton snapped him up after the game, despite interest from several other top clubs.

He was initially loaned out to Dundee North End Juniors, but was recalled to Dens Park a year later. He made his debut for Dundee as a 17-year-old on 13 August 1958 in a 2–1 Scottish League Cup victory over Motherwell.

He was to remain a first team regular at Dundee, going on to make 67 appearances. In March 1960, Bob Shankly had taken over as manager at Dundee and, although he wanted to keep Gabriel, was unable to refuse the offer of £27,000 from Everton's manager, Johnny Carey. This made Jimmy the most expensive player to leave Scotland.

Everton
Gabriel joined Everton after three years at Dundee in March 1960. Although it took him some time to settle into the pace of the English game, there was a steely determination about the young Scot that was to stand him in good stead. Gabriel became a strong influence in the Everton side as a powerful right-half whose preference for a defensive role made him a useful partner in the midfield for the more attacking Brian Harris on the left.

He played 304 games for Everton, scoring 37 goals and won two Scottish caps. At Everton he won the First Division title in 1962-63 and the FA Cup in 1966.

By 1967, he was being challenged for his place in the side by Alan Ball and the emerging Howard Kendall. Southampton's manager Ted Bates tried to sign him initially in March 1967 but Gabriel was reluctant to move South. Eventually, when it was clear that Kendall was to be first-choice, Gabriel agreed to sign for the Saints in July, joining them for a fee of £42,500.

Southampton
At Southampton, Gabriel was a vital part of the defence alongside John McGrath and Denis Hollywood and helped Saints avoid relegation several times. He was a tough defender but had skill to match. He was occasionally drafted in as an emergency striker with some degree of success.

He played a total of 224 matches for the Saints, scoring 27 goals, and was a firm crowd favourite.

AFC Bournemouth, Swindon and Brentford
He left The Dell at the end of the 1971–72 season to join AFC Bournemouth.

He also spent a short period on loan at Swindon Town before finishing his UK playing career at Brentford.

Seattle Sounders
In 1974 Gabriel moved to the United States where he joined the Seattle Sounders of the NASL as a player/assistant coach. That season he anchored the Sounders defence and earned second team NASL All Star recognition. In 1976 the Sounders moved to the newly built Kingdome where he scored the first goal in the stadium's history. The goal, a fabulous header off a cross from Tommy Jenkins, his former Southampton teammate, came against Pelé and the New York Cosmos. In 1977, Gabriel replaced John Best as head coach of the Sounders. Even as a coach, he continued to suit up to play, seeing time in two games in 1977 and one in 1979.

International
Gabriel earned two caps with Scotland and six more with the Scotland under-23 team.

Managerial career

Seattle Sounders and San Jose Earthquakes
Prior to becoming head coach of the Sounders, Gabriel had acted as an assistant coach and head of the Sounders' reserve team program. When he became head coach he had several Sounder legends including Mike England, Geoff Hurst and Bobby Moore on his team. Under his guidance, Seattle made it to the championship game only to fall to the hated New York Cosmos. He was unable to replicate his first year success and in 1980, the Sounders replaced him with Alan Hinton.

In 1980 he was contracted to coach ASL expansion team the Phoenix Fire, but the team folded in pre-season.

Gabriel then went on to coach George Best and the San Jose Earthquakes (NASL) from 1980–1982 for one outdoor season and two indoor seasons. During the 1981–82 indoor season he appeared in a handful of indoor matches for San Jose.

AFC Bournemouth and Everton
On returning to Britain in 1986, he spent four years as coach of Bournemouth, before going back to Goodison Park in 1990, where he became assistant to Colin Harvey at Everton.

He was briefly caretaker manager of Everton for one game in November 1990 and for seven games between December 1993 and January 1994. According to Yahoo! Sports Gabriel's points per game average of 0.14 from his seven games makes him statistically the least successful manager of the Premier League era with one point from a possible 21 gained.

He continued coaching Everton's reserves until 1997.

Back to Seattle
Gabriel returned to Seattle in 1997 where he became an assistant to Dean Wurzberger, who played for Gabriel on the Sounders reserve teams in the 1970s, on the Washington Huskies men's and women's teams. Both teams won the 2000 Pac-10 championships. In addition to other players, Jimmy coached Hope Solo. Gabriel was also the coaching director of the Lake Washington Youth Soccer Association and worked in certifying coaches for the State Association. Jimmy provided radio commentary for the Seattle Sounders. He and his wife, Pat, resided in Kirkland, Washington.

Gabriel also served several years as an assistant coach with the Sounders. On 2 October 2005, the Sounders defeated the Richmond Kickers to take the US Second Division championship. On this high note, Gabriel retired from the Sounders.

On 29 March 2009, Gabriel was honoured by the new Seattle Sounders FC MLS club with the "Golden Scarf" award for his services to soccer in Seattle. He received the scarf at a ceremony on the pitch before the Sounders' second game, versus Real Salt Lake.

Death 
Gabriel suffered from Alzheimer's disease in the later years of his life. He died on 10 July 2021 in Phoenix, Arizona, aged 80.

Honours

Player 
Everton
 Football League champions: 1962–63 
 FA Charity Shield: 1963
 FA Cup winners: 1966

Manager 
Seattle Sounders
NASL Championship: Runners-up 1977
NASL Pacific Conference Championship: 1977
NASL PC Western Division: 1977

References

External links
 1977 Sounders article
 1978 Sounders article
 Meeting with Pelé.
 NASL stats

1940 births
2021 deaths
Footballers from Dundee
Scottish footballers
Association football midfielders
Scottish Football League players
Scotland international footballers
North American Soccer League (1968–1984) players
North American Soccer League (1968–1984) indoor players
Expatriate soccer players in the United States
AFC Bournemouth players
Brentford F.C. players
Dundee F.C. players
Everton F.C. players
Seattle Sounders (1974–1983) players
San Jose Earthquakes (1974–1988) players
Southampton F.C. players
Swindon Town F.C. players
Scottish football managers
Premier League managers
North American Soccer League (1968–1984) coaches
Everton F.C. managers
Seattle Sounders (1974–1983) coaches
San Jose Earthquakes (1974–1988) coaches
Phoenix Fire (soccer) coaches
Seattle Storm (soccer) coaches
Western Soccer Alliance coaches
Expatriate soccer managers in the United States
Scotland under-23 international footballers
Scottish expatriate sportspeople in the United States
Scottish expatriate footballers
Scottish expatriate football managers
Scottish Football League representative players
FA Cup Final players
Association football coaches